The Singles Project is an American interactive dating show series which premiered on August 12, 2014, on Bravo. The show featured a group of young and single professionals living in New York City and trying to find love. The docu-series became the first American dating series showing near real-time situations as each episode of the show is shot and aired within one week. The show later syndicated globally.

Bravo had set up an online hub in order to let the viewers to interact with the show's cast throughout the series' run. The website included the cast biographies, their social media accounts, behind-the-scenes videos, and other material. After each episode the network hosted live Twitter Q&A sessions as well as gave the viewers an opportunity to appear on the show by uploading short social videos.

The cast included Kerry Cassidy, Lee Gause, Joey Healy, Tabasum Mir, Ericka Pittman, and Brian Trunzo.

Episodes

Awards
In 2015, the reality series won Creative Arts Emmy Award in the  Outstanding Multiplatform Storytelling category.

References

External links 

 
 
 

2010s American reality television series
2014 American television series debuts
2014 American television series endings
Bravo (American TV network) original programming
English-language television shows
American dating and relationship reality television series